Political Communication is a quarterly peer-reviewed academic journal covering political communication. It was established in 1980 and is published by  Routledge on behalf of the American Political Science Association and the International Communication Association. The editor-in-chief is Claes de Vreese (University of Amsterdam). According to the Journal Citation Reports, the journal has a 2018 impact factor of 4.339.

See also
 List of political science journals

References

External links

Political science journals
Communication journals
Quarterly journals
Publications established in 1980
Routledge academic journals